Brooke Lewis Bellas (born September 1, 1975) is an American actress known for the mystery thriller iMurders (2008), mobster movie Sinatra Club (2010) and her alter-ego character and passion project Ms. Vampy. After growing up in Philadelphia, she moved to New York City and booked the role of Donna Marsala in the off-Broadway comedy Tony n' Tina's Wedding. After moving to Hollywood, she launched Philly Chick Pictures in 2002 to create more opportunities for herself as an actress. In 2007, she played Dr. Grace Sario in Kinky Killers, which aired on Showtime, earning the title "Scream Queen".

Career

Acting
Lewis Bellas began her professional acting career in New York City and got her first break playing Donna Marsala in the Actors' Equity Off-Broadway comedy Tony n' Tina's Wedding. After a three-year contract, she moved into film. Her first major film came when she was cast as the character Ricko's girl in the Miramax film 54 opposite Mark Ruffalo and Ryan Phillippe.  However, the film went over budget and her scenes were cut from the film. Lewis Bellas continued her career in New York with roles in the popular TV series One Life to Live and the film Pride and Loyalty. After moving to Hollywood, she starred in the short film that won third place in the original Project Greenlight (2001) on HBO, and landed notable TV roles in Quintuples on FOX and Mafiosa.
 Lewis Bellas later co-starred in iMurders, Polycarp, Sinatra Club, Dahmer vs. Gacy and Starship: Rising. In 2009 she created her own TV show, Ms. Vampy, followed by Ms. Vampy's Tween Tawk, Teen Tawk & In Between Tawk (2011) and Ms. Vampy's Love Bites (2013). In 2015, she co-starred in The Mourning opposite Dominique Swain.

Life coach, dating and relationship expert
Lewis Bellas is a board certified life coach and dating and relationship coach and expert. She has done writing, speaking and TV segments for numerous media outlets such as CBS, Huffington Post, FOX and many more.  She is also known as the Co-host on the dating talk show Breaking Dating.

Philanthropy
Since 2008, Lewis Bellas has been an active member of several breast cancer charities, including Busted Foundation and The Lynn Sage Foundation. She was the Hot Hunks of Horror Hottie on the 2009 calendar benefiting The Lynn Sage Foundation for breast cancer research and was co-captain of the Horror Starlets team for Bowling For Boobies, which raised funds and awareness for Busted Foundation. In 2014, she became an active participant in feeding the homeless on Skid Row at the Los Angeles Mission. Lewis Bellas was a celebrity judge for the No Bull Teen Video Awards 2014 to help stop bullying. In 2016, Lewis Bellas became a Celebrity Ambassador for The Breaking The Chains Foundation (BTCF) to support those with eating disorders, body image issues and self-esteem issues.

Other projects

Bibliography
In 2016, Lewis Bellas authored Coaching from a Professed Hot Mess. In 2017, Lewis Bellas authored Ms. Vampy's Teen Tawk: There's a Lotta Power In Ya Choices.

Fashion
In 2016, Lewis Bellas partnered with Rock n’ Roll Lifestyle Company; Metal Babe Mayhem to produce their Rock Your Hot Mess clothing line, and later that year she partnered with TASH Cosmetics to produce their Profess Your Hot Mess make-up and skin care line.

Awards

Filmography
2010: B-Movie Golden Cob Award - Scream Queen Of The Year 2010.
2011: Action on Film Award - Write Brothers Excellence in Film and Video,  Sprinkles.
2012: 18th Annual Communicator Awards - Award Of Distinction, Ms. Vampy's Tween Tawk, Teen Tawk & In Between Tawk.
2016:  Zed Fest Film Festival - Mary Pickford Award as an Exceptional Example of Women in the Art and Business of Motion Picture Production for Acting and Producing.
2017: Actors Awards - Best Actress In A Drama, Sprinkles.
2017: Los Angeles Film Awards - Inspiring Woman in a Film Award, Ms. Vampy's Tween Tawk, Teen Tawk & In Between Tawk.
2017: West Coast Film Festival - Grace Kelly Gold Actor Award, Sprinkles.
2018: Actors Awards - Best Actress In An Indie Film, Psycho Therapy.

Bibliography
Halloween Book Festival – Winner Grand Prize Top Honor.
Beverly Hills Book Awards – Winner Self-Help Motivational Book.
Paris Book Festival – Winner Young Adult Book.

References

External links 
 
 

Living people
American actresses
American people of Italian descent
American people of Romanian descent
1975 births
21st-century American women